In mathematics, Weyl's lemma, named after Hermann Weyl, states that every weak solution of Laplace's equation is a smooth solution. This contrasts with the wave equation, for example, which has weak solutions that are not smooth solutions. Weyl's lemma is a special case of elliptic or  hypoelliptic regularity.

Statement of the lemma
Let  be an open subset of -dimensional Euclidean space , and let  denote the usual Laplace operator. Weyl's lemma states that if a locally integrable function  is a weak solution of Laplace's equation, in the sense that

 

Idea of the proof 
To prove Weyl's lemma, one convolves the function  with an appropriate mollifier  and shows that the mollification  satisfies Laplace's equation, which implies that  has the mean value property. Alternative proofs use the smoothness of the fundamental solution of the Laplacian or suitable a priori elliptic estimates.

Generalization to distributions 
More generally, the same result holds for every  distributional solution of Laplace's equation: If  satisfies  for every , then  is a regular distribution associated with a smooth solution  of Laplace's equation.

Connection with hypoellipticity 
Weyl's lemma follows from more general results concerning the regularity properties of elliptic or hypoelliptic operators.

Notes

References

Lemmas in analysis
Partial differential equations
Harmonic functions